WZTZ (101.1 FM, "The Ball") is a radio station licensed to serve Elba, Alabama, United States. The station is owned by Elba Radio Company. WZTZ broadcasts a sports format.

The station received its original construction permit from the Federal Communications Commission on July 2, 1986. The new station was assigned the call letters WZTZ on July 17, 1986. WZTZ received its license to cover on November 19, 1987.

The station had its call letters changed to WVVL on June 1, 2006.

On March 8, 2021, WVVL changed its format from classic country to a simulcast of sports-formatted WOOF 560 AM Dothan, branded as "The Ball".

On August 22, 2022, WVVL changed its call letters to WZTZ.

References

External links

ZTZ
Sports radio stations in the United States
Radio stations established in 1987
Coffee County, Alabama
1987 establishments in Alabama